MV Le Joola was a Senegalese government-owned roll-on/roll-off ferry that capsized off the coast of The Gambia on 26 September 2002, with 1,863 deaths and 64 survivors. It is thought to be the second-worst non-military disaster in maritime history.

The ship was plying the route from Ziguinchor in the Casamance region to the Senegalese capital, Dakar, when it ran into a violent storm, farther out to sea than it was licensed to sail. The estimated 2,000 passengers aboard (about half of whom lacked tickets) would have amounted to nearly four times the ship's design load. The large numbers sleeping on-deck (and thus above its center of buoyancy) added further instability. Rescue operations did not start for several hours.

A government inquiry principally blamed negligence, and accusations were levelled at both the Senegalese president Abdoulaye Wade and prime minister Mame Madior Boye.

The ship

The ship was named Le Joola after the Jola people of southern Senegal. Le Joola usually traveled twice a week and often carried women who sold mangoes and palm oil in Dakar. At the time of the disaster, the ship had been out of service for almost a year undergoing repairs, which included replacement of the port engine.

Voyage and incident
At about 1:30 pm on 26 September 2002, Le Joola set sail from Ziguinchor in the Casamance region on one of its frequent trips between southern Senegal and Dakar. Although the ship was designed to carry a maximum of 580 passengers and crew, an estimated 1,863 passengers are believed to have been on board, including 185 people who boarded the ship from Carabane, an island where there was no formal port of entry or exit for passengers. The exact number of passengers remains unknown (some Senegalese organizations put the number at over 2,000), but there were 1,034 travelers with tickets. The rest of the passengers were either not required to hold tickets (children aged less than 5) or had been permitted to travel for free, as often happens.

The last call from the ferry staff was broadcast to a maritime security center in Dakar at 10 pm and reported good sailing conditions. At around 11pm, the ship sailed into a storm off the coast of Gambia. As a result of the rough seas and wind, the ferry capsized, throwing passengers and cargo into the sea, all within five minutes.

While many of the ship's passengers may have died during or immediately following the capsizing, a large number probably survived, only to drown while awaiting rescue. Government rescue teams did not arrive at the scene until the morning following the accident, although local fishermen rescued some survivors from the sea several hours before. Only 64 passengers survived. Of more than 600 women on board, only one woman, Mariama Diouf, survived; she was pregnant at the time.

Some time before official rescue teams arrived, local fishermen with pirogues in the area of the tragedy started the first efforts to pull survivors out of the water. They were able to rescue a few people but also recovered several bodies that were floating around Le Joola. At 2pm, they rescued a 15-year-old boy. The boy confirmed that there were still many people trapped alive inside the ship; there were reports of noises and screaming coming from within.

Le Joola remained capsized but afloat until around 3pm, at which point it finally sank stern first, taking with it those who were unable to get out of the ship.

Causes
The colossal loss of life caused by the tragedy was a great shock to many in Senegal and immediately led to calls from the press and public for an explanation of the disaster. The Senegalese government established an inquiry to investigate. The French courts also launched a probe into the disaster as several French nationals were among the dead. According to many sources, the accident was caused by a variety of factors, including possible negligence. While rough seas and wind were directly responsible for the capsizing, the ferry was built only to be sailed in coastal waters but was sailing beyond this coastal limit when it capsized. Overcrowding is one of the most commonly mentioned factors in the disaster, both for the capsizing and the high number of deaths. Due to the heat and claustrophobic conditions below deck, as many passengers as possible usually slept on the upper level, making the ship more unstable. The ship was only 12 years old and was built to be in service for at least 30 years but had suffered a number of technical problems in the years before it capsized. These problems are now attributed to poor maintenance by its owners and not to any design or manufacturing flaws.

Deaths

At least 1,863 people died, although the exact number will never be known due to a large number of unticketed passengers on board. Among the dead were 1,201 male victims (61.5%) and 682 female victims (34.9%). The gender of 70 victims is unknown. The dead included passengers from at least 11 countries beside Senegal: Cameroon, Guinea, Ghana, Nigeria, France, Spain, Norway, Belgium, Lebanon, Switzerland, and the Netherlands.

On 28 September 2002, environmental activist Haïdar El Ali and his diving team explored the disaster area. They saw no survivors, but many bodies of men, women and children inside the ship. 300 corpses trapped inside were freed. Another 100 that were around the ship were also recovered. 551 dead bodies were recovered in total. Of that number, 93 were identifiable and given back to families. The remaining bodies were put to rest in specially-constructed cemeteries in Kabadio, Kantene, Mbao, and on the Gambian coast. National funerals were held on 11 October 2002, at the Esplanade du Souvenir in Dakar.

Reparations and memorials

The Senegalese government initially offered families a payment of around US$22,000 per victim and fired several officials, but no one has ever been prosecuted, and the official report was closed a year after the disaster. Officials were charged with failure to respond quickly enough to the disaster, including high-ranking members of the Armed Forces of Senegal who were moved to other posts. Despite this, little light was ever cast upon those who allowed the ferry to be overloaded or poorly maintained. Prime Minister Mame Madior Boye was dismissed by President Abdoulaye Wade after the disaster with much of her cabinet, reportedly for mishandling the rescue. In the 2007 election, Wade's rival and former Prime Minister, Moustapha Niasse, accused Wade of covering up their responsibility for the disaster. Families of victims, many of whom have been unwilling or unable to claim reparation, have continued to be highly critical of the government over its handling of the rescue, the operation of the ferry which led to the disaster, and the reparation process.

The families of French victims refused the 2003 reparations packages, and have pursued the Senegalese authorities in French courts. On 12 September 2008, French judge Jean-Wilfrid Noël handed down an indictment of nine Senegalese officials, including Boye and former Army Chief of Staff General Babacar Gaye. Senegalese official and popular reaction against these charges coming from the former colonial power have been hostile, with the Senegalese government issuing an arrest warrant for Noël in return.

A documentary by Senegalese journalist Papa Moctar Selane was broadcast on the ninth anniversary of the tragedy, 26 September 2011. The documentary detailed the story of some of the survivors and questioned the slow rescue work.

Senegalese footballer Aliou Cissé lost 12 members of his family in the incident, and his club Birmingham City, in England, displayed a large Senegalese flag to remember the midfielder's family and the other people who lost their lives.

Status of disaster
The sinking of Le Joola is the second-worst non-military maritime disaster in number of lives lost. The first is considered to be  in 1987 with an estimated number of over 4,000 dead. , which sank in 1912 with 1,517 dead, would be third according to the World Almanac  and the New York Times.

See also

 Maritime disasters

References

Further reading

External links
 
 Official website of the Association of the Families of the Victims.

2002 disasters in Africa
Ferries of Senegal
Maritime incidents in 2002
Shipwrecks in the Atlantic Ocean
Shipwrecks of Africa
History of Senegal
2002 in Senegal
2002 in the Gambia
1990 ships